Eckhard Mannischeff (born 30 August 1943) is a German fencer. He competed for East Germany in the team épée event at the 1972 Summer Olympics.

References

External links
 

1943 births
Living people
People from Wismar
People from Mecklenburg
German male fencers
Sportspeople from Mecklenburg-Western Pomerania
Olympic fencers of East Germany
Fencers at the 1972 Summer Olympics